Boguchwałów , is a village in Opole Voivodeship, Głubczyce County, Gmina Baborów.

References

Villages in Głubczyce County